In Greek mythology, Eurylochus or Eurylochos (Ancient Greek: Εὐρύλοχος) may refer to the following characters:

 Eurylochus, an Egyptian prince as one of the sons of King Aegyptus. His mother was the naiad Caliadne and thus full brother of Phantes, Peristhenes, Hermus, Dryas, Potamon, Cisseus, Lixus, Imbrus, Bromius, Polyctor and Chthonius. In some accounts, he could be a son of Aegyptus either by Eurryroe, daughter of the river-god Nilus, or Isaie, daughter of King Agenor of Tyre. Eurylochus suffered the same fate as his other brothers, save Lynceus, when they were slain on their wedding night by their wives who obeyed the command of their father King Danaus of Libya. He married the Danaid Autonoe, daughter of Danaus and the naiad Polyxo.

 Eurylochus, a Salaminian hero who driven out the dragon Cychreides on the isle of Salamis. The said serpent was later on welcomed to Eleusis by Demeter and made her attendant. According to other traditions, Eurylochus instead expelled Cychreus, who was called a dragon on account of his savage nature, from the island. Cychreus was received by Demeter at Eleusis, and appointed a priest to her temple.

 Eurylochos, one of the comrades of the Greek hero Odysseus.
Eurylochus, one of the Suitors of Penelope who came from Zacynthus along with other 43 wooers. He, with the other suitors, was slain by Odysseus with the help of Eumaeus, Philoetius, and Telemachus.

Notes

References 

 Apollodorus, The Library with an English Translation by Sir James George Frazer, F.B.A., F.R.S. in 2 Volumes, Cambridge, MA, Harvard University Press; London, William Heinemann Ltd. 1921. ISBN 0-674-99135-4. Online version at the Perseus Digital Library. Greek text available from the same website.
Apollonius Rhodius, Argonautica translated by Robert Cooper Seaton (1853-1915), R. C. Loeb Classical Library Volume 001. London, William Heinemann Ltd, 1912. Online version at the Topos Text Project.
Apollonius Rhodius, Argonautica. George W. Mooney. London. Longmans, Green. 1912. Greek text available at the Perseus Digital Library.
Stephanus of Byzantium, Stephani Byzantii Ethnicorum quae supersunt, edited by August Meineike (1790-1870), published 1849. A few entries from this important ancient handbook of place names have been translated by Brady Kiesling. Online version at the Topos Text Project.
Strabo, The Geography of Strabo. Edition by H.L. Jones. Cambridge, Mass.: Harvard University Press; London: William Heinemann, Ltd. 1924. Online version at the Perseus Digital Library.
Strabo, Geographica edited by A. Meineke. Leipzig: Teubner. 1877. Greek text available at the Perseus Digital Library.
Tzetzes, John, Allegories of the Odyssey translated by Goldwyn, Adam J. and Kokkini, Dimitra. Dumbarton Oaks Medieval Library, Harvard University Press, 2015. 
 Tzetzes, John, Book of Histories, Book VII-VIII translated by Vasiliki Dogani from the original Greek of T. Kiessling's edition of 1826. Online version at theio.com

Sons of Aegyptus
Suitors of Penelope
Ancient Salamis